The fourth South American Junior Championships in Athletics were held in Lima, Peru from September 21–24, 1962.

Participation (unofficial)
Detailed result lists can be found on the "World Junior Athletics History" website.  An unofficial count yields the number of about 91 athletes from about 5 countries:  Argentina (19), Brazil (24), Chile (18), Ecuador (9), Peru (21).

Medal summary
Medal winners are published for men and women
Complete results can be found on the "World Junior Athletics History" website.

Men

Medal table (unofficial)

References

External links
World Junior Athletics History

South American U20 Championships in Athletics
1962 in Peruvian sport
South American U20 Championships
International athletics competitions hosted by Peru
1962 in youth sport